Vanessa Middleton is an American film and television producer and writer, as well as a film director. Middleton has worked as a writer on shows like Cosby, Girlfriends, and Hangin' with Mr. Cooper. In 2001, Middleton made her feature film directorial debut with the romantic comedy 30 Years to Life, starring Tracy Morgan, Paula Jai Parker, and Allen Payne.

In 2013, Middleton created the web series Walk This Way.

Film and television

Awards and nominations

References

External links
 
 

American film directors
American television actresses
American television producers
American women television producers
American television writers
English-language film directors
American women film directors
Living people
American women screenwriters
American women television writers
Year of birth missing (living people)
Place of birth missing (living people)
21st-century American women